is a designated city in the Kansai region of Honshu in Japan. It is the capital of and most populous city in Osaka Prefecture, and the third most populous city in Japan, following Special wards of Tokyo and Yokohama. With a population of 2.7 million in the 2020 census, it is also the largest component of the Keihanshin Metropolitan Area, which is the second-largest metropolitan area in Japan and the 10th largest urban area in the world with more than 19 million inhabitants.

Osaka was traditionally considered Japan's economic hub. By the Kofun period (300–538) it had developed into an important regional port, and in the 7th and 8th centuries, it served briefly as the imperial capital. Osaka continued to flourish during the Edo period (1603–1867) and became known as a center of Japanese culture. Following the Meiji Restoration, Osaka greatly expanded in size and underwent rapid industrialization. In 1889, Osaka was officially established as a municipality. The construction boom accelerated population growth throughout the following decades, and by the 1900s, Osaka was the industrial hub in the Meiji and Taishō periods. Osaka made noted contributions to redevelopment, urban planning and zoning standards in the postwar period, the city developed rapidly as one of the major financial centers in the Keihanshin Metropolitan Area.

Osaka is a major financial center of Japan, and it is recognized as one of the most multicultural and cosmopolitan cities in Japan. The city is home to the Osaka Exchange as well as the headquarters of multinational electronics corporations such as Panasonic and Sharp. Osaka is an international center of research and development and is represented by several major universities, notably Osaka University, Osaka Metropolitan University, and Kansai University. Famous landmarks in the city include Osaka Castle, Osaka Aquarium Kaiyukan, Dōtonbori, Tsūtenkaku in Shinsekai, Tennōji Park, Abeno Harukas, Sumiyoshi Taisha Grand Shrine, and Shitennō-ji, one of the oldest Buddhist temples in Japan.

Etymology 
Ōsaka means "large hill" or "large slope". It is unclear when this name gained prominence over Naniwa, but the oldest written evidence for the name dates back to 1496.

The kanji  (earth) is also similar to the word  (knight), and  means against, so  can be understand as "samurai rebellion," then  was official name in 1868 after the Meiji Restoration. The older kanji (坂) is still in very limited use, usually only in historical contexts. As an abbreviation, the modern kanji   refers to Osaka City or Osaka Prefecture.

History

Origins: Jōmon and Yayoi period 
In the Jōmon period (7,000 BCE), Osaka was mostly submerged by the Seto Inland Sea, and the small Uemachi-daichi plateau (12 km long and 2.5 km wide), located in the southern part of the city called Uehonmachi, was a peninsula. The Uehonmachi area consisted of a peninsula with an inland sea (Seto Inland Sea) in the east. It is considered one of the first places where inhabitants of Japan settled, both for the favorable geological conditions, rich in fresh water and lush vegetation, and because it was in a position difficult to attack from a military point of view.

Buried human skeletons and a kaizuka (a mound containing remains), were found as well as shell mounds, oysters, and other interesting archaeological discoveries from the Jomon period. In addition to the remains of consumed food, there were arrow heads, stone tools, fishing hooks and crockery with remains from rice processing. It is estimated that the ruins contain 2,000-year-old debris between the Jomon and Yayoi period. The findings of the archeological sites are exhibited in an adjacent building.

In the years between the end of the Jōmon period and the beginning of the Yayoi period, the sediments that were deposited north of the Uemachi-daichi peninsula / plateau transformed the sea that stretched to the east into a lagoon which was called Kawachi. During the Yayoi period (300 BCE-250 CE), permanent habitation on the plains grew as rice farming became popular.

At the beginning of the third century CE the grand shrine of Sumiyoshi-taisha was inaugurated near the harbor, commissioned by consort Empress Jingū. This Shinto shrine structure survived historical events, which inaugurated a new style in the construction of Shinto shrines, called Sumiyoshi-zukuri. The maritime panorama enjoyed from the shrine gardens inspired several artists, and nowadays the representations of that type of landscape are called Sumiyoshi drawings.

Towards the end of the Yayoi period the Uemachi-daichi plateau-peninsula expanded further, transforming the Kawachi Lagoon (河内湖) into a lake connected to the mouth of the Yodo River, which had widened to the south.

Kofun period 

By the Kofun period, Osaka developed into a hub port connecting the region to the western part of Japan. The port of Naniwa-tsu was established and became the most important in Japan. Trade with other areas of the country and the Asian continent intensified. The large numbers of increasingly larger keyhole-shaped Kofun mounds found in the plains of Osaka are evidence of political-power concentration, leading to the formation of a state. The findings in the neighboring plains, including the mausoleum of Emperor Nintoku was discovered nearby in Sakai testify to the status of imperial city that Osaka had reached. Four of these mounds can be seen in Osaka, in which important members of the nobility are buried. They are located in the southern districts of the city and date back to the 5th century. A group of megalithic tombs called Mozu Tombs are located in Sakai, Osaka Prefecture.

Important works of the Kofun period is the excavation that diverted the course of the Yamato River, whose floods caused extensive damage, and the construction of important roads in the direction of Sakai and Nara. Maritime traffic connected to the port of Naniwa-tsu increased in such a way that huge warehouses were built to stow material arriving and departing.

Asuka and Nara period 
The Kojiki records that during 390–430 AD, there was an imperial palace located at Osumi, in what is present day Higashiyodogawa ward, but it may have been a secondary imperial residence rather than a capital.
 
In 645, Emperor Kōtoku built his Naniwa Nagara-Toyosaki Palace in what is now Osaka, making it the capital of Japan. The city now known as Osaka was at this time referred to as Naniwa, and this name and derivations of it are still in use for districts in central Osaka such as Naniwa and Namba. Although the capital was moved to Asuka (in Nara Prefecture today) in 655, Naniwa remained a vital connection, by land and sea, between Yamato (modern day Nara Prefecture), Korea, and China.

Naniwa was declared the capital again in 744 by order of Emperor Shōmu, and remained so until 745, when the Imperial Court moved back to Heijō-kyō (now Nara). By the end of the Nara period, Naniwa's seaport roles had been gradually taken over by neighboring areas, but it remained a lively center of river, channel, and land transportation between Heian-kyō (Kyoto today) and other destinations. Sumiyoshi Taisha Grand Shrine was founded by Tamomi no Sukune in 211 CE. Shitennō-ji was first built in 593 CE and the oldest Buddhist temple in Japan.

Heian to Edo period 
In 1496, Jōdo Shinshū Buddhists established their headquarters in the heavily fortified Ishiyama Hongan-ji, located directly on the site of the old Naniwa Imperial Palace. Oda Nobunaga began a decade-long siege campaign on the temple in 1570 which ultimately resulted in the surrender of the monks and subsequent razing of the temple. Toyotomi Hideyoshi constructed Osaka Castle in its place in 1583. Osaka Castle played a pivotal role in the Siege of Osaka (1614–1615).

Osaka was long considered Japan's primary economic center, with a large percentage of the population belonging to the merchant class (see Four divisions of society). Over the course of the Edo period (1603–1867), Osaka grew into one of Japan's major cities and returned to its ancient role as a lively and important port. Daimyōs (feudal lords) received most of their income in the form of rice. Merchants in Osaka thus began to organize storehouses where they would store a daimyōs rice in exchange for a fee, trading it for either coin or a form of receipt; essentially a precursor to paper money. Many if not all of these rice brokers also made loans, and would actually become quite wealthy and powerful. Osaka merchants coalesced their shops around Dōjima, where the Rice Exchange was established in 1697 and where the world's first futures market would come to exist to sell rice that was not yet harvested.

The popular culture of Osaka was closely related to ukiyo-e depictions of life in Edo. By 1780, Osaka had cultivated a vibrant arts culture, as typified by its famous Kabuki and Bunraku theaters. In 1837, Ōshio Heihachirō, a low-ranking samurai, led a peasant insurrection in response to the city's unwillingness to support the many poor and suffering families in the area. Approximately one-quarter of the city was razed before shogunal officials put down the rebellion, after which Ōshio killed himself. Osaka was opened to foreign trade by the government of the Bakufu at the same time as Hyogo Town (modern Kobe) on January 1, 1868, just before the advent of the Boshin War and the Meiji Restoration. The Kawaguchi foreign settlement, now the Kawaguchi subdistrict, is a legacy of the foreign presence in Osaka.

Osaka residents were stereotyped in Edo literature from at least the 18th century. Jippensha Ikku in 1802 depicted Osakans as stingy almost beyond belief. In 1809, the derogatory term "Kamigata zeeroku" was used by Edo residents to characterize inhabitants of the Osaka region in terms of calculation, shrewdness, lack of civic spirit, and the vulgarity of Osaka dialect. Edo writers aspired to samurai culture, and saw themselves as poor but generous, chaste, and public spirited. Edo writers by contrast saw "zeeroku" as obsequious apprentices, stingy, greedy, gluttonous, and lewd. To some degree, Osaka residents are still stigmatized by Tokyo observers in the same way today, especially in terms of gluttony, evidenced in the phrase, .

Meiji to Heisei period 
With the enormous changes that characterized the country after the Meiji Restoration (1868), and the relocation of the capital from Kyoto to Tokyo, Osaka entered a period of decline. From being the capital of the economy and finance, it became a predominantly industrial center. Osaka was the industrial center most clearly defined in the development of capitalism in Japan. It became known as the "Manchester and Melbourne of the Orient". In 1925, it was the largest and most populous city in Japan and sixth in the world.

The rapid industrialization attracted many Asian immigrants (Indians, Chinese, and Koreans), who set up a life apart for themselves. The political system was pluralistic, with a strong emphasis on promoting industrialization and modernization. Literacy was high and the educational system expanded rapidly, producing a middle class with a taste for literature and a willingness to support the arts. In 1927, General Motors operated a factory called Osaka Assembly until 1941, manufacturing Chevrolet, Cadillac, Pontiac, Oldsmobile, and Buick vehicles, operated and staffed by Japanese workers and managers. In the nearby city of Ikeda in Osaka Prefecture is the headquarters of Daihatsu, one of Japan's oldest automobile manufacturers.

Like its European and American counterparts, Osaka displayed slums, unemployment, and poverty. In Japan it was here that municipal government first introduced a comprehensive system of poverty relief, copied in part from British models. Osaka policymakers stressed the importance of family formation and mutual assistance as the best way to combat poverty. This minimized the cost of welfare programs.

During World War II, Osaka came under air raids in 1945 by the United States Army Air Forces as part of the air raids on Japan. On March 13, 1945, a total of 329 Boeing B-29 Superfortress heavy bombers took part in the raid against Osaka. According to an American prisoner of war who was held in the city, the air raid took almost the entire night and destroyed  of the city. The U.S. bombed the city again twice in June 1945 and again on August 14, a day before Japan's surrender.

In the decades after World War II, the reconstruction plan and the industriousness of its inhabitants ensured Osaka even greater prosperity than it had before the war. Osaka's population regrew to more than three million in the 1960s when large-scale prefectural suburbanization began and doubled to six million by the 1990s. The factories were rebuilt and trade revived, the city were developed rapidly it became a major multicultural and financial center in the postwar period between the 1950s and the 1980s, it is known as the "Chicago and Toronto of the Orient". Osaka Prefecture was chosen as the venue for the prestigious Expo '70, the first world's fair ever held in an Asian country. Since then, numerous international events have been held in Osaka, including the 1995 APEC Summit.

The modern municipality, which when it was established in 1889 occupied an area of just 15 km2 including the districts of Chūō and Nishi, following three successive expansions has reached an area of 222 km2. It was one of the first cities in Japan to obtain designated city status in 1956.

21st century to present
The plan to reorganize Osaka and its province into a metropolis like Tokyo met with stiff opposition in some municipalities, particularly the highly populated Sakai. He then fell back on a project that included the suppression of the 24 wards of Osaka, thus dividing the city into 5 new special districts with a status similar to that of the 23 Special wards of Tokyo. It was introduced by former mayor Tōru Hashimoto, leader of the reform party Osaka Restoration Association which he founded. The referendum of May 17, 2015 called in Osaka for the approval of this project saw the narrow victory of no, and consequently Hashimoto announced his withdrawal from politics. A second referendum for a merger into 4 semi-autonomous wards was narrowly voted down by 692,996 (50.6%).

According to the Forbes list of The World's Most Expensive Places To Live 2009, Osaka was the second most expensive in the world after Tokyo. By 2020 it slipped to 5th rank of most expensive cities.

On March 7, 2014, the 300-meter tall Abeno Harukas opened, which is the tallest skyscraper in Japan surpassing the Yokohama Landmark Tower in Yokohama, until it was surpassed by the 330-meter tall Azabudai Hills Main Tower in Tokyo since 2022.

Geography and climate

Geography 

The city's west side is open to Osaka Bay, and is otherwise completely surrounded by more than ten satellite cities, all of them in Osaka Prefecture, with one exception: the city of Amagasaki, belonging to Hyōgo Prefecture, in the northwest. The city occupies a larger area (about 13%) than any other city or village within Osaka Prefecture. When the city was established in 1889, it occupied roughly the area known today as the Chuo and Nishi wards, only  that would eventually grow into today's  via incremental expansions, the largest of which being a single  expansion in 1925. Osaka's highest point is  Tokyo Peil in Tsurumi-ku, and the lowest point is in Nishiyodogawa-ku at  Tokyo Peil. Osaka has a latitude of 34.67 (near the 35th parallel north), which makes it more southern than Rome (41.90), Madrid (40.41), San Francisco (37.77) and Seoul (37.53).

Climate 
Osaka is located in the humid subtropical climate zone (Köppen Cfa), with four distinct seasons. The city rarely sees snowfall during the winter. Spring in Osaka starts off mild, but ends up being hot and humid. It also tends to be Osaka's wettest season, with the —the rainy season—occurring between early June and late July. The average starting and ending dates of the rainy season are June 7 and July 21 respectively. Summers are very hot and humid. Fall in Osaka sees a cooling trend, with the early part of the season resembling summer while the latter part of fall resembles winter. Precipitation is abundant, with winter being the driest season, while monthly rainfall peaks in June with the "tsuyu" rainy season, which typically ends in mid to late July. From late July through the end of August, summer's heat and humidity peaks, and rainfall decreases somewhat. Osaka experiences a second rainy period in September and early October, when tropical weather systems, including typhoons, coming from the south or southwest are possible.

Cityscape 
Osaka's sprawling cityscape has been described as "only surpassed by Tokyo as a showcase of the Japanese urban phenomenon".

Neighborhoods 

Kita is home to the Umeda district and its immediate surrounding neighborhoods, a major business and retail hub that plays host to Osaka Station City and a large subterranean network of shopping arcades. Kita and nearby Nakanoshima contain a prominent portion of the city's skyscrapers and are often featured in photographs of Osaka's skyline.

Well known districts here include Namba and Shinsaibashi shopping areas, the Dōtonbori canal entertainment area, Nipponbashi Den Den Town, as well as arts and fashion culture-oriented areas such as Amerikamura and Horie. The 300-meter tall Abeno Harukas is the tallest skyscraper in the country since 2014.

The business districts between Kita and Minami such as Honmachi and Yodoyabashi, called , house the regional headquarters of many large-scale banks and corporations. The Midōsuji boulevard runs through Semba and connects Kita and Minami.

Further south of Minami are neighborhoods such as Shinsekai (with its Tsūtenkaku tower), Tennoji and Abeno (with Tennoji Zoo, Shitennō-ji and Abeno Harukas), and the Kamagasaki slums, the largest slum in Japan.

The city's west side is a prominent bay area which serves as its main port as well as a tourist destination with attractions such as Kyocera Dome, Universal Studios Japan and the Tempozan Harbour Village. Higashiosaka is zoned as a separate city, although the east side of Osaka city proper contains numerous residential neighborhoods including Tsuruhashi KoreaTown, as well as the Osaka Castle Park, Osaka Business Park and the hub Kyōbashi Station.

Osaka contains numerous urban canals and bridges, many of which serve as the namesake for their surrounding neighbourhoods. The phrase "808 bridges of Naniwa" was an expression in old Japan used to indicate impressiveness and the "uncountable". Osaka numbered roughly 200 bridges by the Edo period and 1,629 bridges by 1925. As many of the city's canals were gradually filled in, the number dropped to 872, of which 760 are currently managed by Osaka City.

List of wards

There are currently 24 wards in Osaka.

Demographics 

Population numbers have been recorded in Osaka since as early as 1873, in the early Meiji era. According to the census in 2005, there were 2,628,811 residents in Osaka, an increase of 30,037 or 1.2% from 2000. There were 1,280,325 households with approximately 2.1 persons per household. The population density was 11,836 persons per km2. The Great Kantō earthquake caused a mass migration to Osaka between 1920 and 1930, and the city became Japan's largest city in 1930 with 2,453,573 people, outnumbering even Tokyo, which had a population of 2,070,913. The population peaked at 3,252,340 in 1940, and had a post-war peak of 3,156,222 in 1965, but continued to declined since, as the residents moved out to the suburbs.

There were 144,123 registered foreigners, the two largest groups being Korean (60,110) and Chinese (39,551) 2021 years. Ikuno, with its Tsuruhashi district, is the home to one of the largest population of Korean residents in Japan, with 20,397 registered Zainichi Koreans.

Dialect 

The commonly spoken dialect of this area is Osaka-ben, a typical sub-dialect of Kansai-ben. Of the many other particularities that characterize Osaka-ben, examples include using the copula ya instead of da, and the suffix -hen instead of -nai in negative verb forms.

Government 

The Osaka City Council is the city's local government formed under the Local Autonomy Law. The council has eighty-nine seats, allocated to the twenty-four wards proportional to their population and re-elected by the citizens every four years. The council elects its president and Vice President. Toshifumi Tagaya (LDP) is the current and 104th president since May 2008. The mayor of the city is directly elected by the citizens every four years as well, in accordance with the Local Autonomy Law. Tōru Hashimoto, former governor of Osaka Prefecture is the 19th mayor of Osaka since 2011. The mayor is supported by two vice mayors, currently Akira Morishita and Takashi Kashiwagi, who are appointed by him in accordance with the city bylaw.

Osaka also houses several agencies of the Japanese government. Below is a list of governmental offices housed in Osaka.

 Japan Coast Guard, Fifth Regional Headquarters
Japan Fair Trade Commission; Kinki, Chugoku, Shikoku Office
 Kinki Regional Finance Bureau
 Kinki Regional Economy, Trade and Industry Bureau
 Kinki Regional Transportation Bureau
 Kinki Communications Bureau
 Kinki Regional Development Bureau
 Kinki Regional Police Bureau
 Ministry of Foreign Affairs, Osaka Office
 Osaka Customs
 Osaka District Court
 Osaka Family Court
 Osaka High Court
 Osaka Immigration
 Osaka Labour Bureau
 Osaka Meteorological Observatory
 Osaka Public Prosecutors Office
 Osaka Regional Aerospace Bureau
 Osaka Regional Law Bureau
 Osaka Regional Taxation Bureau
 Osaka Summary Court

Developments
In July 2012, a joint multi-party bill was submitted to the Diet that would allow for implementation of the Osaka Metropolis plan as pursued by the mayor of Osaka city, the governor of Osaka and their party. If implemented, Osaka City, neighboring Sakai City and possibly other surrounding municipalities would dissolve and be reorganized as four special wards of Osaka prefecture – similar to former Tokyo City's successor wards within Tokyo prefecture. Special wards are municipal-level administrative units that leave some otherwise municipal administrative responsibilities and revenues to the prefectural administration.

In October 2018, the city of Osaka officially ended its sister city relationship with San Francisco in the United States after the latter permitted a monument memorializing "comfort women" to remain on a city-owned property, circulating in the process a 10-page, 3,800-word letter in English addressed to San Francisco mayor London Breed.

On November 1, 2020, a second referendum to merge Osaka's 24 wards into 4 semi-autonomous wards was narrowly voted down. There were 692,996 (50.6%) votes against and 675,829 (49.4%) votes supported it. Osaka mayor and Osaka Ishin co-leader Ichiro Matsui said he would resign when his term ends in 2023.

Energy policies

Nuclear power 
On February 27, 2012, three Kansai cities, Kyoto, Osaka, and Kobe, jointly asked Kansai Electric Power Company to break its dependence on nuclear power. In a letter to KEPCO they also requested to disclose information on the demand and supply of electricity, and for lower and stable prices. The three cities were stockholders of the plant: Osaka owned 9% of the shares, while Kobe had 3% and Kyoto 0.45%. Toru Hashimoto, the mayor of Osaka, announced a proposal to minimize the dependence on nuclear power for the shareholders meeting in June 2012.

On March 18, 2012, the city of Osaka decided as largest shareholder of Kansai Electric Power Co, that at the next shareholders-meeting in June 2012 it would demand a series of changes:
 that Kansai Electric would be split into two companies, separating power generation from power transmission.
 a reduction of the number of the utility's executives and employees.
 the implementation of absolutely secure measurements to ensuring the safety of the nuclear facilities.
 the disposing of spent fuel.
 the installation of new kind of thermal power generation to secure non-nuclear supply of energy.
 selling all unnecessary assets including the stock holdings of KEPCO.
In this action, Osaka had secured the support of two other cities and shareholders: Kyoto and Kobe, but with their combined voting-rights of 12.5 percent they were not certain of the ultimate outcome, because for this two-thirds of the shareholders would be needed to agree to revise the corporate charter.

At a meeting held on April 10, 2012, by the "energy strategy council", formed by the city of Osaka and the governments of the prefectures, it became clear that at the end of the fiscal year 2011 some 69 employees of Kansai Electric Power Company were former public servants. "Amakudari" was the Japanese name for this practice of rewarding by hiring officials that formerly controlled and supervised the firm. Such people included the following:
 13 ex-officials of the: Ministry of Land, Infrastructure, Transport and Tourism
 3 ex-officials of the Ministry of Economy, Trade and Industry,
 2 ex-officials of the Ministry of the Environment,
 16 former policemen,
 10 former fire-fighters,
 13 former civil engineers.

Besides this, it became known that Kansai Electric had done about 600 external financial donations, to a total sum of about 1.695 billion yen:
 70 donations were paid to local governments: to a total of 699 million yen
 100 donations to public-service organizations: 443 million yen,
 430 donations to various organizations and foundations: a total of 553 million yen
During this meeting some 8 conditions were compiled, that needed to be fulfilled before a restart of the No.3 and No.4 reactors Oi Nuclear Power Plant:
 the consent of the local people and government within 100 kilometer from the plant
 the installation of a new independent regulatory agency
 a nuclear safety agreement
 the establishment of new nuclear safety standards
 stress tests and evaluations based on these new safety rules

Economy 

The gross city product of Osaka in fiscal year 2004 was ¥21.3 trillion, an increase of 1.2% over the previous year. The figure accounts for about 55% of the total output in the Osaka Prefecture and 26.5% in the Kinki region. In 2004, commerce, services, and manufacturing have been the three major industries, accounting for 30%, 26%, and 11% of the total, respectively. The per capita income in the city was about ¥3.3 million, 10% higher than that of the Osaka Prefecture. MasterCard Worldwide reported that Osaka ranks 19th among the world's leading cities and plays an important role in the global economy. Osaka's GDP per capita (Nominal) was $59,958.($1=\120.13) However, by 2020, Osaka ranked as the 5th most expensive city due to flatlining consumer prices and government subsidies of public transportation.

Historically, Osaka was the center of commerce in Japan, especially in the middle and pre-modern ages. Nomura Securities, the first brokerage firm in Japan, was founded in the city in 1925, and Osaka still houses a leading futures exchange. Many major companies have since moved their main offices to Tokyo. However, several major companies, such as Panasonic, Sharp, and Sanyo, are still headquartered in Osaka. Recently, the city began a program, headed by mayor Junichi Seki, to attract domestic and foreign investment. In the 2017 Global Financial Centres Index, Osaka was ranked as having the 15th most competitive financial center in the world and fifth most competitive in Asia (after Singapore, Hong Kong, Tokyo, and Shanghai).

The Osaka Securities Exchange, specializing in derivatives such as Nikkei 225 futures, is based in Osaka. The merger with JASDAQ will help the Osaka Securities Exchange become the largest exchange in Japan for start-up companies.

According to global consulting firm Mercer, Osaka was the second most expensive city for expatriate employees in the world in 2009. It jumped up nine places from 11th place in 2008 and was the eighth most expensive city in 2007. However, it was not ranked in the top ten places of the list in 2013. The Economist Intelligence Unit (EIU) ranked Osaka as the second most expensive city in the world in its 2013 Cost of Living study.

Keihanshin

Osaka is part of the metropolitan region called Keihanshin (aka Greater Osaka) in the Kansai region. The Keihanshin region includes the prefectures of Osaka, Kyoto, Hyōgo (Kobe), Nara, Shiga, Wakayama, Sakai. It is ranked the second most urban region in Japan after the Greater Tokyo area and 10th largest urban area in the world. Keihanshin has a GDP of approximately $953.9 billion in 2012 (16th largest in the world). Osaka-Kobe has a GDP of $681 billion (2015), which is a bit more than Paris or Greater London.

Transportation 

Greater Osaka has an extensive network of railway lines, comparable to that of Greater Tokyo.

Osaka connects to its surrounding cities and suburbs via the JR West Urban Network as well as numerous private lines such as Keihan Electric Railway, Hankyu Railway, Hanshin Electric Railway, Kintetsu Railway, and Nankai Electric Railway.

The Osaka Metro system alone ranks 8th in the world by annual passenger ridership, serving over 912 million people annually (a quarter of Greater Osaka Rail System's 4 billion annual riders), despite being only 8 of more than 70 lines in the metro area.

All Shinkansen trains including Nozomi stop at Shin-Osaka Station and provide access to other major cities in Japan, such as Kobe, Kyoto, Nagoya, Yokohama, and Tokyo.

Regular bus services are provided by Osaka City Bus, as well Hankyu, Hanshin and Kintetsu, providing a dense network covering most parts of the city.

Osaka is served by two airports situated just outside of the city, Kansai International Airport (IATA: KIX) which handles primarily international passenger flights and Osaka International Airport (IATA:ITM) which handles mostly domestic services and some international cargo flights.

Due to its geographical position, Osaka's international ferry connections are far greater than that of Tokyo, with international service to Shanghai, Tianjin, Korea along with domestic routes to Kitakyushu, Kagoshima, Miyazaki and Okinawa.

Culture and lifestyle

Shopping and food 
Osaka has a large number of wholesalers and retail shops: 25,228 and 34,707 respectively in 2004, according to the city statistics. Many of them are concentrated in the wards of Chuō (10,468 shops) and Kita (6,335 shops). Types of shops vary from malls to conventional shōtengai shopping arcades, built both above- and underground. Shōtengai are seen across Japan, and Osaka has the longest one in the country. The Tenjinbashi-suji arcade stretches from the road approaching the Tenmangū shrine and continues for  going north to south. The stores along the arcade include commodities, clothing, and catering outlets.

Other shopping areas include Den Den Town, the electronic and manga/anime district, which is comparable to Akihabara; the Umeda district, which has the Hankyu Sanbangai shopping mall and Yodobashi Camera, a huge electrical appliance store that offers a vast range of fashion stores, restaurants, and a Shonen Jump store.

Osaka is known for its food, in Japan and abroad. Author Michael Booth and food critic François Simon of Le Figaro have suggested that Osaka is the food capital of the world. Osakans' love for the culinary is made apparent in the old saying "Kyotoites are financially ruined by overspending on clothing, Osakans are ruined by spending on food."

Osaka is known for its fine sake, which is made with fresh water from the prefecture's mountains. Osaka's culinary prevalence is the result of a location that has provided access to high-quality ingredients, a high population of merchants, and proximity to the ocean and waterway trade. In recent years, Osaka has started to garner more attention from foreigners with the increased popularity of cooking and dining in popular culture.

Other shopping districts include:
 American Village (Amerika-mura or "Ame-mura") – fashion for young people
 Dōtonbori – part of Namba district and considered heart of the city
 Namba – main shopping, sightseeing, and restaurant area
 Shinsaibashi – luxury goods and department stores
 Umeda – theaters, boutiques, and department stores near the train station

Entertainment and performing arts 

 Osaka is home to the National Bunraku Theatre, where traditional puppet plays, bunraku, are performed.
 At Osaka Shochiku-za, close to Namba station, kabuki can be enjoyed as well as manzai.
 At Shin Kabuki-za, formerly near Namba and now near Uehommachi area, enka concerts and Japanese dramas are performed.
 Yoshimoto Kogyo, a Japanese entertainment conglomerate operates a hall in the city for manzai and other comedy shows: the Namba Grand Kagetsu hall.
 The Hanjō-tei opened in 2006, dedicated to rakugo. The theatre is in the Ōsaka Tenman-gū area.
 Umeda Arts Theater opened in 2005 after relocating from its former 46-year-old Umeda Koma Theater. The theater has a main hall with 1,905 seats and a smaller theater-drama hall with 898 seats. Umeda Arts Theatre stages various type of performances including musicals, music concerts, dramas, rakugo, and others.
 The Symphony Hall, built in 1982, is the first hall in Japan designed specially for classical music concerts. The Hall was opened with a concert by the Osaka Philharmonic Orchestra, which is based in the city. Orchestras such as the Berlin Philharmonic and Vienna Philharmonic have played here during their world tours as well.
 Osaka-jō Hall is a multi-purpose arena in Osaka-jō park with a capacity for up to 16,000 people. The hall has hosted numerous events and concerts including both Japanese and international artists.
 Nearby City Hall in Nakanoshima Park, is Osaka Central Public Hall, a Neo-Renaissance-style building first opened in 1918. Re-opened in 2002 after major renovation, it serves as a multi-purpose rental facility for citizen events.
 The Osaka Shiki Theatre is one of the nine private halls operated nationwide by the Shiki Theatre, staging straight plays and musicals.
 Festival Hall was a hall hosting various performances including noh, kyōgen, kabuki, ballets as well as classic concerts. The Bolshoi Ballet and the Philharmonia are among the many that were welcomed on stage in the past. The hall has closed at the end of 2008, planned to re-open in 2013 in a new facility.

Annual festivals 

Other festivals in Osaka include the Aizen Matsuri (June 30–July 2, Shōman-in Temple), the Sumiyoshi Matsuri (July 30–August 1, Sumiyoshi Taisha), Shōryō-e (April 22, Shitennō-ji) and Tōka-Ebisu (January 9–10, Imamiya Ebisu Jinja). The annual Osaka Asian Film Festival takes place in Osaka every March.

Museums and galleries 

The National Museum of Art (NMAO) is a subterranean Japanese and international art museum, housing mainly collections from the post-war era and regularly welcoming temporary exhibitions. Osaka Science Museum is in a five storied building next to the National Museum of Art, with a planetarium and an OMNIMAX theatre. The Museum of Oriental Ceramics holds more than 2,000 pieces of ceramics, from China, Korea, Japan and Vietnam, featuring displays of some of their Korean celadon under natural light. Osaka Municipal Museum of Art is inside Tennōji park, housing over 8,000 pieces of Japanese and Chinese paintings and sculptures.  The Osaka Museum of History, opened in 2001, is located in a 13-story modern building providing a view of Osaka Castle. Its exhibits cover the history of Osaka from pre-history to the present day. Osaka Museum of Natural History houses a collection related to natural history and life.

Sports 

Osaka hosts four professional sport teams: one of them is the Orix Buffaloes, a Nippon Professional Baseball team, playing its home games at Kyocera Dome Osaka. Another baseball team, the Hanshin Tigers, although based in Nishinomiya, Hyōgo, plays a part of its home games in Kyocera Dome Osaka as well, when their homeground Koshien Stadium is occupied with the annual National High School Baseball Championship games during summer season.

There are two J.League clubs, Gamba Osaka, plays its home games at Suita City Football Stadium. Another club Cerezo Osaka, plays its home games at Yanmar Stadium Nagai. The city is home to Osaka Evessa, a basketball team that plays in the B.League. Evessa has won the first three championships of the league since its establishment. Kintetsu Liners, a rugby union team, play in the Top League. After winning promotion in 2008–09, they will again remain in the competition for the 2009–10 season. Their base is the Hanazono Rugby Stadium.

The , one of the six regular tournaments of professional sumo, is held annually in Osaka at Osaka Prefectural Gymnasium.

Another major annual sporting event that takes place in Osaka is Osaka International Ladies Marathon. Held usually at the end of January every year, the  race starts from Nagai Stadium, runs through Nakanoshima, Midōsuji and Osaka castle park, and returns to the stadium. Another yearly event held at Nagai Stadium is the Osaka Gran Prix Athletics games operated by the International Association of Athletics Federations (IAAF) in May. The Osaka GP is the only IAAF games annually held in Japan.

Osaka made the bid for the 2008 Summer Olympics and the 2008 Summer Paralympics but was eliminated in the first round of the vote on July 13, 2001, which awarded the game to Beijing.

Osaka was one of the host cities of the official Women's Volleyball World Championship for its 1998, 2006 and 2010 editions.

Osaka is the home of the 2011 created Japan Bandy Federation and the introduction of bandy, in the form of rink bandy, was made in the city. In July 2012 the first Japan Bandy Festival was organized.

Media 

Osaka serves as one of the media hubs for Japan, housing headquarters of many media-related companies. Abundant television production takes place in the city and every nationwide TV network (with the exception of TXN network) registers its secondary-key station in Osaka. All five nationwide newspaper majors also house their regional headquarters, and most local newspapers nationwide have branches in Osaka. However major film productions are uncommon in the city. Most major films are produced in nearby Kyoto or in Tokyo. The Ad Council Japan was founded in 1971 is based in Osaka, now it is the Osaka branch.

Newspapers 
All five major national newspapers of Japan, The Asahi Shimbun, Mainichi Shimbun, Nihon Keizai Shimbun, Sankei Shimbun and Yomiuri Shimbun, have their regional headquarters in Osaka and issue their regional editions. Furthermore, Osaka houses Osaka Nichi-nichi Shimbun, its newspaper press. Other newspaper-related companies located in Osaka include the regional headquarters of FujiSankei Business i.;Houchi Shimbunsha; Nikkan Sports; Sports Nippon, and offices of Kyodo News Jiji Press; Reuters; Bloomberg L.P.

Television and radio 
The five TV networks are represented by Asahi Broadcasting Corporation (ANN), Kansai Telecasting Corporation (FNN), Mainichi Broadcasting System, Inc. (JNN), Television Osaka, Inc. (TXN) and Yomiuri Telecasting Corporation (NNN), headquartered in Osaka. NHK has also its regional station based in the city. AM Radio services are provided by NHK as well as the ABC Radio (Asahi Broadcasting Corporation), MBS Radio (Mainichi Broadcasting System, Inc.) and Radio Osaka (Osaka Broadcasting Corporation) and headquartered in the city. FM services are available from NHK, FM OSAKA, FM802 and FM Cocolo, the last providing programs in multiple languages including English.

Publishing companies 
Osaka is home to many publishing companies, including Examina, Izumi Shoin, Kaihou Shuppansha, Keihanshin Elmagazine, Seibundo Shuppan, Sougensha, and Toho Shuppan.

Education 

Public elementary and junior high schools in Osaka are operated by the city of Osaka. Its supervisory organization on educational matters is Osaka City Board of Education. Likewise, public high schools are operated by the Osaka Prefectural Board of Education.

Osaka once had a large number of universities and high schools, but because of growing campuses and the need for larger area, many chose to move to the suburbs, including Osaka University.

Historically foreign expatriates in the Kansai region preferred to live in Kobe rather than Osaka. As a result, until 1991 the Osaka area had no schools catering to expatriate children. Osaka International School of Kwansei Gakuin, founded in 1991, is located in nearby Minoh, and it was the first international school in the Osaka area. The Great Hanshin-Awaji earthquake of 1995 caused a decline in demand for international schools, as there were about 2,500 U.S. nationals resident in Osaka after the earthquake while the pre-earthquake number was about 5,000. American Chamber of Commerce in Japan (ACCJ) Kansai chapter president Norman Solberg stated that since 2002 the numbers of expatriates in Kansai were recovering "but the fact is there is still a persistent exodus to Tokyo." In 2001 the city of Osaka and YMCA established the Osaka YMCA International School.

Colleges and universities include:

 Kansai University
 Morinomiya University of Medical Sciences
 Osaka Metropolitan University
 Osaka University of Economics
 Osaka Institute of Technology
 Osaka Jogakuin College
 Osaka Seikei University
 Osaka University of Arts, Minamikawachi District, Osaka
 Osaka University of Comprehensive Children education
 Osaka University of Education
 Soai University
 Tokiwakai Gakuen University

Libraries 
 International Institute for Children's Literature, Osaka
 Osaka Prefectural Nakanoshima Library
 Osaka Municipal Central Library

Learned society 
 The Japanese Academy of Family Medicine

Facilities 
"Important cultural property" (重要文化財) after the name of a facility indicates an important cultural property designated by the country.

Leisure facilities and high-rise buildings 

 OAP Tower
 
 Osaka Business Park
 Intex Osaka
 
 Namba Parks
 Universal Studios Japan
 
 Osaka Prefectural Government Sakishima Building
 Umeda Sky Building
 Abeno Harukas
 Tsūtenkaku (Registered Tangible Cultural Property)
 Festivalgate

Historical site 

 Osaka Castle
 
 Tekijuku (important cultural property)

Parks and gardens 

 Utsubo Park
 
 Nakanoshima Park
 Osaka Castle Park
 
 
 
 
 Tennoji Park
 Nagai Park
 Sumiyoshi Park

Ancient architecture 
 Sumiyoshi Taisha main shrine (national treasure)

Modern architecture 

 Around Umeda
 –  – 
 Nakanoshima
 (Important Cultural Property) – Osaka Prefectural Nakanoshima Library (Important Cultural Property) – Bank of Japan Osaka Branch Old Building
 Around Osaka Castle
 (Former Youth Art Gallery) (Important Cultural Property) – Senpukan (Important Cultural Property) – Osaka Castle (registered tangible cultural property) – former Osaka City Museum – 
 Kitasenba, Minamisenba
 (Registered Tangible Cultural Property) – Osaka Securities Exchange – Sumitomo Mitsui Banking Osaka (Sumitomo Building) –  (Registration Tangible Cultural Property) –  (Important Cultural Property) – Nippon Life Insurance Head Office Building –  (registered tangible cultural property) – Sumitomo Mitsui Bank Osaka Central Branch –  –  –  (Registered Tangible Cultural property) –  (registered tangible cultural property) –  (important cultural property) –  (registered tangible cultural property) –  (registered tangible cultural property) –  (Important Cultural Property) – Meidi-Ya building –  (Registered Tangible Cultural Properties) – 
 Shimojoba (Nishisenba)
 (registered tangible cultural property) – Yamauchi Building (registered tangible cultural property) – Edobori Kodama Building (registered tangible cultural property)
 Shinsaibashi/Namba
Daimaru Shinsaibashi – Takashimaya Osaka (Nankai Namba) – Takashimaya East Annex –  (registered tangible cultural property)
 Osaka Port/Kawaguchi
 –  – MOL Mitsui Tsuki Port Building – Japan Anglican Church Kawaguchi Christian Church (Registered Tangible Cultural Property) –  – Osaka Municipal Transportation Bureau (Osaka City Electricity Bureau)

Theaters and halls 

 
 Umeda Arts Theater
 
 NHK Osaka Hall
 Osaka International Convention Center
 
 
 Osaka-jō Hall
 Orix Theater
 National Bunraku Theatre
 
 
 
 Zepp Osaka
 
 
 Festival Hall, Osaka

Sport venues 

 
 Osaka Municipal Central Gymnasium
 Osaka Prefectural Gymnasium
 Maruzen Intec Osaka Pool
 Kyocera Dome Osaka
 Nagai Park
 Yanmar Stadium Nagai
 Yanmar Field Nagai
 Yodoko Sakura Stadium
 Maishima Sports Island

Religious facilities 
 Shrines

 Sumiyoshi Taisha
 Osaka Tenmangu
 
 
 
 Ikukunitama Shrine
 Tamatsukuri Inari Shrine
 
 
 
 
 
 
 
 
 
 

 Temples

 Shitennō-ji
 
 
 
 
 Isshin-ji
 Taiyū-ji
 
 
 

 Churches

 
 
 Japan Anglican Church
 Japan Christian Church Osaka Fukushima Church
 Japan Evangelical Lutheran Osaka Church

Mosques
 Osaka Masjid

International relations

Twin towns – sister cities
Osaka is twinned with:

  San Francisco, CA, United States (former partnership, October 1957–October 2018)
  São Paulo, Brazil (since October 1969)
  Chicago, IL, United States (since November 1973)
  Shanghai, China (since April 1974)
  Melbourne, Victoria, Australia (since April 1978)
  Saint Petersburg, Russia (since August 1979)
  Milan, Lombardy, Italy (since June 1981)
  Hamburg, Germany (since May 1989)
  Toronto, ON, Canada (since June 1994)

Friendship cooperation cities
Osaka also cooperates with:
  Budapest, Hungary (1998)
  Busan, South Korea (2008)
  Buenos Aires, Argentina (1998)
  Dnipro, Ukraine (2022)

Business partner cities
Osaka's business partner cities, mostly in the Asia-Pacific region, are:

  Auckland, New Zealand
  Bangkok, Thailand
  Hamburg, Germany
  Ho Chi Minh City, Vietnam
  Hong Kong, China
  Jakarta, Indonesia
  Kuala Lumpur, Malaysia
  Manila, Philippines
  Melbourne, Victoria, Australia
  Mumbai, Maharashtra, India
  Seoul, South Korea
  Shanghai, China
  Singapore
  Tianjin, China

Sister ports
Osaka's sister ports are:

  Port of Busan, South Korea
  Port of Le Havre, France
  Port of Melbourne, Australia
  Port of San Francisco, United States
  Port of Valencia, Spain
  Port of Shanghai (friendship port treaty)
  Port of Valparaiso, Chile
  Saigon Port, Vietnam

See also 
 Expo '70
 Expo 2025
 List of metropolitan areas by population

Notes

References

Further reading 

De Lange, William. (2022). The Siege of Osaka Castle: The Winter and Summer Campaigns. Groningen: Toyo Press. 
 Gerstle, C. Andrew. Kabuki Heroes on the Osaka Stage 1780–1830 (2005).
 Hanes, Jeffrey. The City as Subject: Seki Hajime and the Reinvention of Modern Osaka (2002) online edition
 Hauser, William B. "Osaka: a Commercial City in Tokugawa Japan." Urbanism past and Present 1977–1978 (5): 23–36.
 Hein, Carola, et al. Rebuilding Urban Japan after 1945. (2003). 274 pp.
 Hotta, Chisato. "The Construction of the Korean Community in Osaka between 1920 and 1945: A Cross-Cultural Perspective." PhD dissertation U. of Chicago 2005. 498 pp. DAI 2005 65(12): 4680-A. DA3158708 Fulltext: ProQuest Dissertations & Theses
 Lockyer, Angus. "The Logic of Spectacle C. 1970," Art History, Sept 2007, Vol. 30 Issue 4, p571-589, on the international exposition held in 1970
 McClain, James L. and Wakita, Osamu, eds. Osaka: The Merchants' Capital of Early Modern Japan. (1999). 295 pp. online edition
 Michelin Red Guide Kyoto Osaka Kobe 2011 (2011)
 Najita, Tetsuo. Visions of Virtue in Tokugawa Japan: The Kaitokudo Merchant Academy of Osaka. (1987). 334 pp. online edition
 Rimmer, Peter J. "Japan's World Cities: Tokyo, Osaka, Nagoya or Tokaido Megalopolis?" Development and Change 1986 17(1): 121–157. 
 Ropke, Ian Martin. Historical Dictionary of Osaka and Kyoto. 273pp Scarecrow Press (July 22, 1999) .
 Ruble, Blair A. Second Metropolis: Pragmatic Pluralism in Gilded Age Chicago, Silver Age Moscow, and Meiji Osaka. (2001). 464 pp.
 Torrance, Richard. "Literacy and Literature in Osaka, 1890–1940," The Journal of Japanese Studies 31#1 (Winter 2005), pp. 27–60 in Project MUSE

External links 

Osaka City official website 
 Official Osaka Tourist Guide
 
 

Osaka
Cities in Osaka Prefecture
Port settlements in Japan
Populated coastal places in Japan
Cities designated by government ordinance of Japan
Populated places with period of establishment missing